Jill Stuart (born 1965) is an American fashion designer based in New York City, where she has been operating since 1988. She established her eponymous label in 1993. She also has a significant international client base, particularly in Japan.

Early life
Stuart was born in New York City in 1965. Her parents George and Lynn Stuart worked in Manhattan's Garment District and created the label Mister Pants, which was an early creator of women's tailored trousers and trouser suits in men's fabrics. Lynn Stuart also had her own higher end label, and became known for creating outfits for actresses including Lucille Ball, Natalie Wood, and Sheila MacRae.

Stuart attended Manhattan's Dalton School and later Rhode Island School of Design.

Career
Stuart sold her first collection to Bloomingdale's by the age of 15 – suede hobo bags and silver and leather chokers. She opened her first store in 1988, an Upper East Side boutique focusing on accessories such as belts and handbags. By 1990, her stoles, bags and fur accessories could be found in stores such as Neiman Marcus and Bergdorf Goodman. Her eponymous label was launched in 1993 and included Skinclothes – a range of leather garments, such as slip dresses, kilts, jeans and jackets.

Items from her collection appeared in the 1995 movie Clueless. The following year, Stuart's designs were stocked by Bloomingdale's stores in the US.

From the mid 1990s, Stuart began opening stores in Japan, including branches in Tokyo, Osaka and Kobe, and concessions in some 70 outlets across the country. Later the brand was sold in South Korea. In 2007, Lindsay Lohan was photographed by Mario Sorrenti as the face of the brand in Japan, becoming the subject of some controversy.

The brand is reported to have annual sales of around $30 million in the US, plus Asian sales of nearly $100 million. Customers include Hilary Swank, Kate Bosworth and Leighton Meester.

Family
Stuart lives in SoHo, New York. Her daughter, Morgan Curtis, established the Morgan Lane brand of sleepwear and lingerie in 2012 after working for Stuart.

References

External links

American fashion designers
American women fashion designers
High fashion brands
American fashion businesspeople
American women company founders
American company founders
Businesspeople from New York City
Rhode Island School of Design alumni
Dalton School alumni
1980s fashion
1990s fashion
2000s fashion
2010s fashion
Living people
1965 births
21st-century American women